Yasmina Laaroussi (born 15 February 1994) is a Moroccan footballer who plays as a midfielder for Italian Serie C club Venezia Calcio and the Morocco women's national team.

Club career 
Laaroussi has played for Servette in Switzerland.

International career
Laaroussi made her senior debut for Morocco on 14 June 2021 in a 3–2 friendly home win over Mali.

See also
List of Morocco women's international footballers

References

External links 

1994 births
Living people
Citizens of Morocco through descent
Moroccan women's footballers
Women's association football midfielders
Morocco women's international footballers
Moroccan expatriate sportspeople in Italy
Expatriate women's footballers in Italy
Sportspeople from the canton of Geneva
Swiss women's footballers
Servette FC Chênois Féminin players
Swiss Women's Super League players
Swiss expatriate women's footballers
Swiss expatriate sportspeople in Italy
Swiss people of Moroccan descent
Sportspeople of Moroccan descent